The 2012 NCAA Division III baseball tournament was played at the end of the 2012 NCAA Division III baseball season to determine the 37th national champion of college baseball at the NCAA Division III level. The tournament concluded with eight teams competing at Time Warner Cable Field at Fox Cities Stadium in Grand Chute, Wisconsin for the championship. Eight regional tournaments were held to determine the participants in the World Series. Regional tournaments were contested in double-elimination format, with four regions consisting of six teams, and four consisting of eight, for a total of 56 teams participating in the tournament, up from 55 in 2011.

Bids
The 56 competing teams were:

Regionals
''Bold indicates winner.

Central Regional
USA Stadium-Millington, TN (Host: Rhodes College)

New England Regional
Eastern Baseball Stadium-Mansfield, CT (Host: Eastern Connecticut State University)

New York Regional
Farmingdale State Baseball Stadium-East Farmingdale, NY (Host: State University of New York at Farmingdale)

Mid-Atlantic Regional
FirstEnergy Park-Lakewood, NJ (Host: Kean University)

Midwest Regional
Prucha Field at James B. Miller Stadium-Whitewater, WI (Host: University of Wisconsin-Whitewater)

South Regional
Captains Park-Newport News, VA (Host: Christopher Newport University)

Mideast Regional
Don Schaly Stadium-Marietta, OH (Host: Marietta College)

West Regional
Roy Helser Field and Jim Wright Stadium-McMinnville, OR (Host: Linfield College)

World Series
Time Warner Cable Field at Fox Cities Stadium-Grand Chute, WI (Host: University of Wisconsin-Oshkosh/Lawrence University/Fox Cities Convention and Visitors Bureau)

References

NCAA Division III Baseball Tournament
2012 college baseball season